Encrypted is a 2022 Bengali language psychological thriller web series written and directed by Souptick C. The main cast in the web series is Payel Sarkar, Aishwarya Sen, Richa Sharma, Amitabh Acharya, Rana Mukherjee and Rana Basu Thakur. The music is composed by Aamlaann Chakraabarty and Ripon Hossain is the cinematographer.

Plot 
The life of two sisters, Taniya and Diya, is the subject of the novel Encrypted. Taniya is addicted to drugs and is in desperate need of money to buy narcotics. She learned about the malicious Dark Dare programme. People are forced to take on dangerous duties in exchange for money or fantastic benefits. She engages in activities and becomes embroiled in a minister's murder plot as a result of her attempts to satisfy her addiction. After being fatally tortured by police after being captured, she kills herself.

Diya, her older sister, enters to explain her sister's unexpected death. She finds how the Dark Dare app has harmed the lives of many youngsters, including her sister, and is helped in her search by ACP Hema Singh, the investigating police officer, and reporter Sohag. Diya learned after further investigation that her sister was a victim of a sophisticated scheme. She decided to get revenge for the death of her sister.

Cast 
Payel Sarkar
Richa Sharma
Aishwarya Sen
Amitabh Acharya
Rana Basu Thakur
Arpita Das
Rana Mukherjee
Indranil De
Surjendra Bagchi

Episodes

Reception 
Netseries gave it 4.7 rating out of 5. While Binged gave it 4.7 out of 10 ratings.

Soundtrack 
1. Encrypted (Original Score from the series)

References

External links 
 

Bengali-language web series
Indian web series
Indian thriller films
2022 films